State Route 10 (SR 10) is a major west–east state highway in the U.S. state of Alabama, running for  through the southern part of the state. It is the lowest even-numbered route in the state that is not an unsigned partner route assigned to a U.S. Highway. It is also the only signed state route that extends from the Mississippi state line to the Georgia state line. The western terminus of the route is in northwestern Choctaw County near the community of Yantley, where it serves as a continuation of Mississippi Highway 19 (MS 19). The eastern terminus of the route is in Henry County near Shorterville. Once in Georgia, the route is designated as Georgia State Route 37 (SR 37).

Route description

SR 10 begins its eastward journey at the Mississippi state line near Lisman, where it continues westward as Mississippi Highway 19. The highway passes through several small towns, including Butler and Sweet Water as it approaches its interchange with U.S. Highway 43 (SR 13) in Dixons Mills.

West of its interchange with Interstate 65 (I-65) at exit 128 in Greenville, the route passes through the Black Belt, traditionally one of the poorer areas of the state. SR 10 then passes through Luverne, Troy, and Abbeville, before reaching the Chattahoochee River at the Georgia state line, where it continues eastward as Georgia State Route 37.

There is a low clearance under a railroad underpass in Greenville.

Major intersections

Greenville truck route

Alabama State Route 10 Truck (SR 10 Truck) is a truck route of SR 10 around downtown Greenville. The highway runs  between SR 10 and I-65 on the west side of town to SR 10, and SR 185 Truck east of the community. The truck route allows large vehicles to bypass the roundabout at the county courthouse downtown.

See also

References

External links

010
Transportation in Henry County, Alabama
Transportation in Barbour County, Alabama
Transportation in Pike County, Alabama
Transportation in Crenshaw County, Alabama
Transportation in Butler County, Alabama
Transportation in Wilcox County, Alabama
Transportation in Marengo County, Alabama
Transportation in Choctaw County, Alabama
Transportation in Clay County, Alabama